The North Wales Craftsmen and General Workers' Union was a trade union in the United Kingdom. It merged with the Transport and General Workers' Union in 1923.

References
Arthur Ivor Marsh. Concise encyclopedia of industrial relations. Gower Press, Dec 1, 1979 pg. 316

See also

 List of trade unions
 Transport and General Workers' Union
 TGWU amalgamations

Defunct trade unions of the United Kingdom
Trade unions disestablished in 1923
Economic history of Wales
Transport and General Workers' Union amalgamations
Trade unions in Wales